Tamganj is an Indian village in Araria district, Bihar.

References

Villages in Araria district